The Sonoran pronghorn (Antilocapra americana sonoriensis) is an endangered subspecies of pronghorn that is endemic to the Sonoran Desert.

Conservation
Around 200 animals currently are believed to exist in Arizona in the United States, up from an estimated 21 individuals in 2002. The number of individuals in Mexico is estimated to be even lower. It is considered extirpated from California.

In 2012, announcements of two reintroductions were published in the Federal Register. One of the reintroductions was to take place at the Barry M. Goldwater Air Force Range (BMGR) in Yuma, Arizona, and the second was to be at Kofa National Wildlife Refuge.

Obstacles to recovery
Numerous and ongoing threats exist to the survival of the Sonoran pronghorn. Not the least of these threats is the fact that much of their habitat is occupied by the BMGR, which is an active United States Air Force bombing range.

Adjacent to the BMGR is the Cabeza Prieta National Wildlife Refuge (CPNWR), also a critical breeding area for this species. Parts of the CPNWR are off limits to visitors between mid-March and mid-July, during the fawning season, so as to minimize disturbance to herds with fawns, which can result in the loss of fawns. Despite this fact, this area too is subject to constant environmental pressure. The accompaniments of illegal trafficking of people and drugs from Mexico (such as the construction of illegal roads and trails, reckless disposal of trash, destruction of vegetation, and contamination of water sources) have significantly degraded the habitat. The response from law enforcement agencies (such as the U.S. Customs and Border Protection and the Drug Enforcement Administration) has also exacerbated this problem.

Mortality
Living in open areas, pronghorns in general must rely on their eyesight to avoid predators, and with population numbers so low, the Sonoran pronghorn must avoid mortality at all costs. Sources of mortality come from predators, drought, and lack of feed; these sources usually affect fawns most often, and adult mortality also occurs in drought situations. Controlling this situation is very difficult because drought is at the hand of the weather. Things that can be done are predator control on coyotes and bobcats, but this is yet to be studied with enough detail to be proven effective.

Habitat
The Sonoran pronghorn is endemic to the Sonoran Desert. They live in open spaces and primarily forage grasses and shrubs for food. Desert pronghorn are more adapted to desert conditions, and can go longer without water.

References

Further reading
 Border Patrol: Along the Devil's Highway
 Cabeza Prieta National Wildlife Refuge
 Cabeza Prieta National Wildlife Refuge – Arizona
 Vehicle Trails Associated with Illegal Border Activities on Cabeza Prieta National Wildlife Refuge – July 2011
 Protecting the Sonoran pronghorn from extinction, National Parks Traveler – January 2020

Endangered fauna of the United States
Fauna of Mexico
Pronghorns
ESA endangered species
Taxa named by Edward Alphonso Goldman